Johannes Luukkanen (born 30 March 1999) is a Finnish professional footballer who plays for FC Ilves, as a goalkeeper.

References

1999 births
Living people
Finnish footballers
Klubi 04 players
FC Ilves players
Veikkausliiga players
Association football goalkeepers